The Queensland Reds is the rugby union team for the Australian state of Queensland that competes in the Southern Hemisphere's Super Rugby competition. Prior to 1996, they were a representative team selected from the rugby union club competitions in Queensland. With the introduction of the professional Super 12 competition they moved to a model where players are contracted to the Reds through the Queensland Rugby Union rather than selected on the basis of club form.

From 1996 to 2005 they were one of three Australian teams competing in the Super 12 competition, alongside the New South Wales Waratahs and the ACT Brumbies. Queensland finished as minor premiers in 1996 and 1999. From 2006 to 2010, they competed in the expanded Super 14 competition as one of four Australian sides. Beginning in 2011, they are one of five Australian sides in the expanded and renamed Super Rugby, winning the competition in its first season in its new format (2011). In 2012 they finished first in the Australian conference and won the Super Rugby AU title in 2021, when regionalised competitions were played due to the COVID-19 pandemic.

History

Early Queensland years
Refer also to Rugby union in Queensland

The first recorded games of rugby in Queensland were played in 1876, when the existing Brisbane Football Club (formed in 1866), switched to rugby to align with the newly formed 'Rangers' and 'Bonnet Rouge' football clubs. However, it was reported that the game was soon varied to suit the preferences of the local players, and “rugby, with Brisbane variations, was the game played” (The Brisbane Courier, 10 July 1876). Most of these games were played at the Queen's Park (now part of the City Botanic Gardens (see image at right). However, the Brisbane Courier reported in 1879 that the Brisbane FC had reverted to what had become known as the 'Victorian rules', “in place of the Rugby Union Rules played by the club during the last three seasons”.

In 1880, the club became a foundation member of the Queensland Football Association (QFA), along with Wallaroo, Excelsiors and Athenians (Ipswich), where it was decided to recognise and play mostly 'Victorian rules', with occasional games of 'Rugby' rules. However, in 1882, a Brisbane FC representative (Daniel Foley Pring Roberts) arranged a rugby match against the Sydney Wallaroos Rugby club, after the NSWRU (Rugby Union) offered to pay all costs associated with the match. Brisbane advocates of the Victorian rules game reacted angrily and declared that no QFA player would be permitted to play under rugby rules, which led to the formation of the Northern Rugby Union (now the Queensland Rugby Union) in late 1883.

The following years saw rapidly increasing popularity of the rugby game. As rugby historian Sean Fagan noted:

The defining moment in the code battle came with the 1886 Queensland [Rugby] side, who defeated NSW for the first time in Sydney. “The success of this team undoubtedly won the day for rugby game in Queensland. The Victorian game supporters were struggling hard to uphold the premier position they had gained but after the brilliant performance of the 1886 team, who lost only one match through their tour, the rugby game became very popular and the next season several new clubs were formed and the Victorian game began to wane” (QRU Annual, 1902).

In 1883, the first inter-colonial match in Brisbane took place, with Queensland defeating New South Wales 12 to 11 at the Eagle Farm Racecourse. In 1896 the first Queensland team departed for a tour of New Zealand, where they played New Zealand at Athletic Park in Wellington on 15 August, losing 9 to nil. In 1899 Queensland recorded their first win against an international team, defeating The Lions 11 to 3 at the Exhibition Ground (see team photo at right).

The Queensland team remained a representative team selected solely from the rugby union clubs within the state, until the advent of the Super rugby competition in the 1990s.

Pre-Super competitions
With the start up of rugby league as well as World War I, Queensland rugby was dormant for a number of years, and the QRU was disbanded in 1919 and was not revived until the late 1920s. In 1928 the QRU was re-formed, and the GPS competition and major clubs soon returned. The game struggled during World War II, but growth was nonetheless apparent, with the advent of the Queensland Junior Rugby Union and the Country Rugby Union. In 1950 the QRU secured the Normanby Oval at nominal rent from Brisbane Grammar School, before they moved into Ballymore Stadium in 1966, which would serve as the spiritual home of Queensland. In 1980 Queensland defeated the All Blacks, which was their first win against New Zealand. The match was played at Ballymore on 6 July and Queensland won 9 to 3. Two seasons later centenary celebrations took place, with Queensland defeating New South Wales 41 to 7 in the celebratory match.

Early Super Rugby
The first Super 10 was held in 1993. Queensland were grouped in Pool A alongside Auckland, Natal, Western Samoa and Otago. Queensland finished with five points, in fourth place. The subsequent Super 10 competition of 1994 saw Queensland finish at the top of Pool A on 13 points, edging out North Harbour on for and against differential to finish at the top. The Queensland Reds went on to play the winner of Pool B, South African side, . The Reds won the final, 21 points to 10 at Kings Park Stadium in Durban. The following season was even more successful for the Reds, who were playing in Pool B for the 1995 season. They finished the season with 16 points, four points clear of second placed team in their pool, the Free State. South African team Transvaal had finished at the top of Pool A and the final was to be decided at Ellis Park in Johannesburg. Queensland won the final 30–16, and thus became back-to-back champions.

Super 12
With rugby union going professional, there was a reworking of competitions. The SANZAR partnership was formed between the New Zealand Rugby Football Union (NZRFU), the South African Rugby Football Union (SARFU) and the Australian Rugby Union (ARU) and the Super 12 was born. In the 1996 season Queensland finished at the top of the table.

Queensland hosted their Super 12 semi-final on 18 May 1996. The game was played at Queensland's home of rugby union, Ballymore, and was played against the Sharks. The Sharks defeated Queensland 43–25. The 1997 season saw the Reds finish in ninth place. In 1998 the Reds had a much better season, finishing in fifth position at the end of the season.

In 1999 Queensland lost only three games during the regular season, and finished at the top of the ladder on 36 points (beating the Stormers to first position due to for and against points). The Reds hosted the Canterbury Crusaders at Ballymore for a semi-final. Canterbury won 28–22. In 2000 the Reds finished in seventh place on the ladder. In 2001 the Reds finished in fourth place on the ladder and played in the semis. They played fellow Australian team, the Brumbies in Canberra, and the Brumbies won 30 points to six. The following season, 2002, the Reds finished in fifth place. For the 2003 season, Queensland finished in eighth place. Queensland finished tenth in the 2004 and 2005 Super 12 seasons.

Super 14
In 2006, the Super 12 became the Super 14 with the addition of the Western Force (AUS) and the Cheetahs (RSA). Queensland played the Waratahs in the opening game of the season, which was a close loss. The Reds also played new team the Western Force, which Queensland won. Queensland finished 12th on the ladder. Former Wallabies coach Eddie Jones took over from Jeff Miller as coach for the 2007 season.

New coach Eddie Jones got off to a winning start at Queensland Rugby, with a Queensland XV, 63–22 victory over the NEC club. The Reds took part in the one-off Australian Provincial Championship not getting the start they wanted, losing to the Force 32–6 at home in round one but turned it around the next week beating the Waratahs 39–17 in Gosford. The following week the Reds beat the competition leaders the Brumbies 20–19 after a penalty goal by Lloyd Johansson to qualify for the final in the ACT against the same team they beat. However, Queensland lost 42–17. Later in the year Queensland beat the Cherry Blossoms 29–22 in Japan.

The 2007 Super 14 season saw the Queensland Reds finishing a poor season by winning the wooden spoon, they couldn't have started the competition any better when they beat 2006 Grand Finalists the Wellington Hurricanes in Round 1, after that win they would not taste victory again until Round 12. The season was summed up in the final round of the regular season where Queensland were defeated 92–3 by the Bulls. This defeat was by the largest margin in Super Rugby history, although the NSW Waratahs had 96 points scored against them in their loss to the Crusaders in 2002.

The 2008 Super 14 season witnessed a mini-resurgence of the Qld Reds, with the youthful side playing exciting and enterprising rugby under new coach Phil Mooney, they gained revenge against the Bulls after the 2007 thrashing by beating them 40–8, in what was the highlight of the season for the Reds. The Reds continued to play exciting rugby for the rest of the season but lost close matches against the Crusaders, Blues, Chiefs and Waratahs, while the side finished 12th they showed plenty of promise and regained some respect.

The 2010 Super 14 showed the real potential of a team that had been on the ropes for the last 6 years. After losing their star back Berrick Barnes to the Waratahs they unearthed the talent they had not noticed like that of Quade Cooper, Digby Ioane and Will Genia. They became the feel–good team of the year becoming the only team to beat both the year's finalists under the new coach, former Waratahs mentor Ewen McKenzie. The highlight of their year was their 19–12 victory over the Bulls in which they played out a fast game to beat a truly world class side. A late injury plague affected the last two games of the season and ultimately a finals spot. Although the Reds missed the finals, they showed good prospects for the 2011 Super Rugby season.

Super Rugby

In the debut season of the renamed and revamped Super Rugby competition, the Queensland Reds showed their improvement from the previous few years. The Reds finished the regular season at the top of the table, with 13 wins and 3 losses. In the final, Queensland Reds achieved their first Super Rugby Championship in the professional era, beating the Crusaders (18–13) in front of a record crowd (52,113) at Suncorp Stadium, Brisbane. Following the win the Reds were handed the keys to the city after a ticker-tape parade through Brisbane.

Following the title win, though, the Reds fell down the Super Rugby ladder, finishing 13th in 2014 and 2015, and 15th in 2016 and 14th in 2017, post Super Rugby Expansion.

In 2018, former All Black Brad Thorn was appointed head coach, where he promised to turn the franchise around. Despite finishing 13th and sacking several high-profile players, the Reds had their most successful season in five years.

They repeated their 6–10 record in 2019, before making the coronavirus-enforced Super Rugby AU final in 2020, losing to the Brumbies.

As the COVID-19 pandemic continued, domestic competitions continued in 2021. The Reds impressed in this, winning 7 of their 8 games, winning the final against the Brumbies, before finishing 7th in Super Rugby Trans-Tasman.

Colours and logos

The teams' home strip traditionally was a maroon jumper with a white collar, navy shorts with maroon socks with white hoops. In more recent years the jumper has become more red in colour with the home playing strip now red jumper (no collar), red shorts and red socks. The jersey is manufactured by KooGa, and the primary shirt sponsor from 2011 St George Bank . Traditionally, the Reds Super Rugby logo as well as the traditional Q logo both appear on the jersey, however for 2007 a commemorative shield was worn instead, which incorporated the QRU's four logos over the past 100 years. The Super Rugby logo and sponsors Tooheys New appear on the sleeves. The alternative jersey is similar, except that it is predominantly white. The Reds' logo is a Koala, a native Australian animal, with Reds written underneath it.

Prior to 1895 the Queensland team wore a variety of jerseys until the red/maroon colour became the Queensland jersey. In 2007, the Reds used a commemorative jersey in celebration of 125 years of Queensland rugby. This was accompanied by a new logo featuring four Queensland crests from the past. The 125-year crest featured four sectors: the Northern Rugby Union logo from 1882 (top left), the emblem from 1910 (top right), the 1935 logo (bottom left) and the current koala logo (bottom right).

Uniform

Kit sponsors

Awards
The Pilecki Medal is awarded to the best Reds player at the end of each season.

Stadium
 
The traditional home of Queensland Rugby is Ballymore, which was built in the late 1960s in Herston. Throughout the Super 12, the Reds played their home matches at that stadium.

With the expansion of Super 12 to 14 for the 2006 season, the Reds moved to the 52,500-seat Suncorp Stadium; which has been described as an investment in the future of the Queensland Rugby, with easier access and world class facilities.

The Reds have also played numerous pre-season games at the Gold Coast, Sunshine Coast, and Darling Downs regions, in order to raise the team's profile outside of Brisbane.

In 2006 and 2021, the Reds travelled to Townsville to play a regular season game, both times attracting almost 20 000.

Anthem/Chants
In January 2007, the Queensland Reds released a team anthem to be sung by the crowd during matches and after wins. The song was sung in the Queen Street Mall by members of the team including John Roe, Ben Tune, Peter Hynes and Berrick Barnes . The Reds also launched new marketing campaigns for 2007 (e.g. "Join the Revolution"/"The Red Army Needs You"); and the fans have since been referred to as "The Red Army". Major sponsor St George Bank sponsor a cheer squad at some games known as the St George Fan Bank.

At home games, the chant “We are Red” is commonplace as the home crowd get behind their team.

‘Take Me Home, Country Roads’ by John Denver is belted out at the conclusion of wins, an anthem of sorts.

Fans
The Reds have one of the largest and die-hard followings in Brisbane, averaging 19 118 at their 2021 home games and filling Suncorp Stadium for their 6 semi-final and two Grand Final appearances, including the 2021 Harvey Norman Super Rugby AU Final against the ACT Brumbies.

Queensland Rugby CEO David Hanham claimed the fan base was growing once more after half a decade of on-field struggles, with the organisation passing 10 000 members in 2021 for the first time since 2016. He also pointed out how the organisation has the potential to be the largest sports union in Queensland.

Rivalries
Queenslands most popular rivalries are against the other Australian teams in Super Rugby (Brumbies, Western Force, Waratahs and Melbourne Rebels). The most famous of these rivalries is the interstate clash between the Queensland Reds and the New South Wales Waratahs. The match between these two sides usually draws the largest crowd for the Reds when they are hosting the match, which is sometimes (such as in 2006), used as the first game of the season. The Bob Templeton Cup is a trophy awarded to the winner of the Queensland/New South Wales match.

Former Queensland captain John Eales, prior to the Queensland and New South Wales clash in 2001, quoted former Wallaby Mark Loane to sum up matches against New South Wales, "the most hard fought fights are fighting with your brother in the backyard". There have been over 270 matches between the two teams, with New South Wales well in the lead with over 170 wins, and Queensland over 80, with 12 drawn. Since the start of professional Super rugby in 1996, 17 matches have been played, Queensland winning nine, New South Wales seven, and one being drawn.

Region
 
 
Due to historical and practical reasons, the team represents the entire state of Queensland. However the team has been based entirely in the South East Queensland region since its foundation. The team has played matches at numerous venues, including Queen's Park, the Eagle Farm Racecourse, the Brisbane Showgrounds, Ballymore Stadium and its current home Lang Park.

Development teams
The QRU formerly owned and managed two National Rugby Championship teams, Brisbane City and Queensland Country. These NRC teams drew on a range of players ranging from full-time professionals to those on incentive contracts. These teams were closely aligned with the Reds and train at Ballymore, the QRU's training base used by the Reds. The NRC is now defunct but is set to return in the near future.

Brisbane City and Queensland Country also field Under 19, 18, and 16 teams.

Queensland Reds A
The Queensland A team plays matches against interstate and international representative teams, and has also competed in tournaments such as the Pacific Rugby Cup. Known by various names over the years including Queensland A, Reds A, Reds College XV, and Reds Academy, the team is selected from the best emerging rugby talent in Queensland. The squad is a mix of Reds contracted players, extended training squad members, Queensland Under 19s, and selected Premier Rugby club players.

Under 19
Two Queensland teams, Brisbane City U19 and Queensland Country U19, play in the national URC competition. Prior to 2008, state colts teams at under 21 and under 19 age levels were fielded in national tournaments and in the Trans-Tasman Trophy, but these teams were consolidated as under 20s ahead of the inaugural World Rugby U20 Championship. In 2018, an under 19 age limit was reinstated for the national colts team competition.

Members

†Only three home matches due to COVID-19 pandemic.

Records and Achievements

Season by season record

Current squad

The Queensland Reds squad for the 2023 Super Rugby Pacific season is:

Awards

Player Award Winner
Pilecki Medal (Players' Player) is the award given to the Queensland Reds player of the year for that season. The medal is named after stalwart Queensland prop Stan Pilecki, the first player to represent Queensland in 100 matches.

Australian Super Rugby Player Award Winner
 1998 – John Eales
 2000 – Chris Latham
 2003 – Chris Latham
 2004 – Chris Latham
 2005 – Chris Latham
 2010 – Quade Cooper
 2011 – Will Genia
 2012 – Will Genia
 2021 – James O’Connor

Australian Super Rugby Coach Award Winner
 1998 – John Connolly
 1999 – John Connolly
 2011 – Ewen McKenzie
 2021 – Brad Thorn

Australian Super Rugby Rookie of the Year 
 1999 – Nathan Sharpe
 2001 – David Croft
 2004 – Drew Mitchell
 2006 – Anthony Mathison
 2009 – Laurie Weeks
 2020 – Harry Wilson

Australian Super Rugby Try of the Year 
 1998 – Dan Herbert
 2001 – Nathan Spooner
 2009 – Quade Cooper
 2010 – Quade Cooper
 2013 – Rod Davies

Notable players
Players with 100 or more caps.

Personnel

Coaches

Amateur Era

  (1989–1996*)

Coach of the Reds for South Pacific Championship, Super 6 and Super 10.

Professional Era

As of 3 June 2022. 
*continued role from Amateur Era.

Captains

Honours

Professional era
 Super Rugby (1996–):
 Champions (1): 2011
 Playoff appearances (5): 1996, 1999, 2001, 2012, 2013, 2022
 Super Rugby AU (2020–2021):
 Champions (1): 2021
 Runners-up (1): 2020
 Australian Provincial Championship (APC):
 Runners-up (1): 2006
 Ricoh National Championship:
 Champions (1): 2000

Amateur era
 Super 10:
 Champions (2): 1994, 1995
 Super 6:
 Champions (1): 1992

Records and statistics
 Highest point scorer in a career – Michael Lynagh (1,145 points, 1982–1994)
 Highest point scorer in a season – Quade Cooper (228 points, 2011)
 Highest try scorer in a career – Brendan Moon (69 tries, 1978–1987)
 Highest try scorer in a season – Brendan Moon (16 tries, 1978)
 Highest appearance – Sean Hardman (148, 1999–2010)
 Highest captain – James Horwill (69, 2006–2015)

 Largest victory – Victoria 76–0 (1978)
 Largest defeat – Bulls 3–92 (2007)

See also

 Brisbane City
 Queensland Country
 Queensland Premier Rugby

Notes

References

External links
 

 
Super Rugby teams
Sporting clubs in Brisbane
Rugby union teams in Queensland
Queensland representative sports teams
Rugby clubs established in 1882
1882 establishments in Australia
Super Rugby champions